HMS Jaguar (F37), was a  Type 41 anti-aircraft frigate of the British Royal Navy, named after the jaguar. Jaguar was the last frigate built by William Denny and Brothers for the Royal Navy. Unlike the rest of her class, she was fitted with controllable pitch propellers.

Royal Navy service
The main armament originally consisted of two twin 4.5 in guns Mark 6 plus one twin STAAG mounting, which was soon replaced by a 40 mm gun. She was refitted in the mid-1960s, replacing the Type 960 long-range air warning radar with Type 965. The lattice mainmast was replaced by a plated structure to support the heavier AKE1 aerial used by the Type 965. The Type 293Q target designation radar on the foremast was replaced by a Type 993. New ESM and SCCM equipment was installed on the foremast. It was intended that Seacat missile would replace the 40 mm gun but this was not done to save money.

Jaguar sailed from Chatham United Kingdom in January 1969 and undertook a world cruise calling at Gibraltar, South Africa, Mombasa, Singapore, Hong Kong, New Zealand, Australia, Tasmania, Fiji, Tonga, Raratonga, Tahiti, Pitcairn, Panama and Florida. During this cruise she provided medical aid at Astove, in the Seychelles. She arrived back in the UK in December 1969 and was deployed to Icelandic waters for the Second Cod War in 1973. On 10 September 1973, she collided with the Icelandic gunboat Thor (Þór), and had her bows damaged. She spent the rest of the month on dry dock for repairs at Chatham. She was then assigned to the standby squadron but was recommissioned in 1976 for service in Icelandic waters again for the Third Cod War. To protect her bows and stern from damage from collisions with Icelandic gunboats, she was fitted with heavy wooden sheathing.

Bangladesh Navy service
After a spell in reserve, she was sold on 6 July 1978 to the Bangladesh Navy for £2 million and commissioned in 1978 as BNS Ali Haider (F17). Ali Haider was decommissioned during a ceremony held in her home port of Chittagong on 22 January 2014. Name and number were taken by one of the two former Chinese Jianghu III-class frigates which reportedly had already begun their transfer voyage.

See also
List of ships built by William Denny and Brothers

References

Publications

See also
List of ships of the Bangladesh Navy

 

Leopard-class frigates
Ships built on the River Clyde
Maritime incidents in 1973
1957 ships